Gheybi (also Romanized as Gheybī; also known as Gheybī-ye Pā’īn) is a village in Zagheh Rural District, Zagheh District, Khorramabad County, Lorestan Province, Iran. At the 2006 census, its population was 64, in 15 families.

References 

Towns and villages in Khorramabad County